The Laurel fig (Ficus ilicina) is a species of rock-splitting fig that is native to the semi-desert regions of southwestern Africa.

Description
It is mostly evergreen, though a few are bare in spring, just before new foliage emerges. The elliptic leaves are more than twice as long as they are wide, shiny above and matte below. The sessile or stalked figs are produced in the summer months.

Range
It occurs in southwestern Angola, the Namibian escarpment and Khomas hochland, and in the Northern Cape, South Africa.

Species associations
The pollinating wasp is Elisabethiella enriquesi (Grandi). The figs are eaten by birds and people.

References

External links
 

Trees of Africa
Flora of Southern Africa
ilicina
Taxa named by Friedrich Anton Wilhelm Miquel